Horace Pinker is an American punk rock band formed in 1991 in Tempe, Arizona and based in Chicago, Illinois. They combine a pop-punk musical sound with catchy hooks and political lyrics.

Horace Pinker has played in more than 21 countries including Europe, Brazil, China and Australia. They have played festivals including the Dynamo Open Air in the Netherlands, Popkomm in Germany, Belgium’s Groezrock, 2007 Vans ZonaPunk Tour in Brazil, PouzzaFest in Montreal and The Fest 11 in Gainesville, FL. In pre-electronic navigation times, they were guided to these places by a road atlas named "Gregory". 

They have appeared on over 30 compilations albums, 12 EP’s (including a split with Face To Face and an EP on Fat Wreck Chords), the DVD video compilations Cinema Beer Nuts (Hopeless) and Punk Broadcast System (Coldfront) plus numerous TV shows and features in various magazines.

They have toured for the releases of Power Tools (Justice), Burn Tempe To The Ground (Onefoot), Pop Culture Failure (Jump Up!) and Copper Regret (Coldfront) that featured Chris Bauermeister formerly of Jawbreaker on bass, Red-Eyed Regular (OffTime), Texas One Ten (Thick), the retrospective Carnival Nostalgia: 2000-2006 (Enemy One) and 2011′s Local State Inertia (Jump Start, Arctic Rodeo/OffTime).

Reviews have focused on the bands’ commitment to combine their trademark pop hooks with the buzz of a two-guitar attack, aggressive pop punk sound that eludes categorization by blurring the lines between multiple genres.

In 2010, the band toured China, Singapore, Australia and New Zealand; as well as were in the studio recording the follow up to 2005’s Texas One Ten.

After a tour of Canada in August 2011 they will release their new record “Local State Inertia” in Europe October 2011 followed by a European tour in March 2012. The US release for “Local State Inertia” was November 2012 on Jump Start Records.

Line up 
 Current Members
Greg Mytych - bass, vocals
Bryan Jones - drums (founding member)
Scott Eastman - guitar, vocals (founding member)
Former Members
Bill Ramsey - drums (founding member)
Miguel Barron - bass (Deminer, Armchair Martian)
Matt Arluck - guitar (Deminer, Sweet Cobra)
Chris Bauermeister - bass (Jawbreaker)
Jesse Everhart - guitar
Jonathan Richardson - guitar/bass (Early Day Miners)
Gregg Dessen - bass (founding member)
Karl Eifrig - bass (Lynyrd's Innards, Mexican Cheerleader)
Don Meehleis - guitar, vocals
Jeff Dean - guitar (The Bomb, All Eyes West, Noise By Numbers)

Discography 
Full-lengths & EPs
Powertools (1994, Earwax/Justice)
Burn Tempe to the Ground (1996, Onefoot)
Copper Regret EP (2000, Coldfront)
Pop Culture Failure (2000, Jump Up!)
Red-Eyed Regular EP (2003, OffTime Records)
Texas One Ten (2005, Thick)
Carnival Nostalgia: 2000-2006 (2007, Enemy One Records)
Local State Inertia (2011, Arctic Rodeo Recordings)
Local State Inertia (2012, Jump Start Records)
Recover EP (2015, Dead Broke Rekerds)
House of Cards EP (2022, OffTime Records)
Seven-inches
Big Ugly (1991, Earwax)
Forty-Seven (1992, Earwax)
Knives, Guns, & Ammo (1993, Rhetoric)
Disposable comp (1994, Social Retard)
Face to Face/Horace Pinker split (1994, Rhetoric)
DIY Polemic Machine (1995, Blurr)
Selling Out the Scene (1995, Evade)
Horace Pinker / Doc Hopper split (1995, OffTime)
Song About Selling Out (1995, Fat Wreck Chords)
80's Punk comp (1995, Suburban Zine)
Live in New Zealand (1996, only 7 pressed)
Horace Pinker Live (1997, V.M.L.)
Numerous Compilations

Television 
Horace Pinker songs were used in the following television programs:
Orleans, CBS, 1997, song Switch from Powertools
Party Of Five, FOX, 1997, song 67 Cents from Powertools
Homicide: Life on the Street, NBC, 1998, song First Everything from Powertools

External links 
Official website
 Arctic Rodeo Recordings Artist page
Horace Pinker on PureVolume
 Thick Records band page

Offtime Records
Jump Up! Records
Review of Texas One Ten by punknews.org

Indie rock musical groups from Illinois
Musical groups established in 1991
Musical groups from Chicago
Pop punk groups from Illinois